Arthur Joseph Lewis Jr. (born September 3, 1934) served in the Massachusetts House of Representatives in 1970 and the Massachusetts Senate as a Democrat from 1972 to 1990.

References

Democratic Party members of the Massachusetts House of Representatives
20th-century American politicians
1934 births
Living people
Democratic Party Massachusetts state senators